Udara is a genus of butterflies in the family Lycaenidae. The species are found in the Indomalayan and the Australasian realms.

Species
Subgenus Udara Toxopeus, 1922
 Udara akasa (Horsfield, 1828) - white hedge blue (India)
 Udara aristinus (Fruhstorfer, 1917)
 Udara aristius (Fruhstorfer, 1910)
 Udara camenae (de Nicéville, [1895])
 Udara cardia (Felder, 1860)
 Udara coalita (de Nicéville, 1891)
 Udara cyma (Toxopeus, 1927)
 Udara dilectissima (Druce, 1895)
 Udara dilecta (Moore, 1879) (India, China, Malay Peninsula)
 Udara drucei (Bethune-Baker, 1906)
 Udara etsuzoi Eliot & Kawazoé, 1983
 Udara lanka Moore, 1877 - Ceylon hedge blue (Sri Lanka)
 Udara masinissa (Fruhstorfer, 1910)
 Udara placidula (Druce, 1895)
 Udara rona (Grose-Smith, 1894)
 Udara serangana Eliot & Kawazoé, 1983
 Udara singalensis (R. Felder, 1868)
 Udara tenella (Miskin, 1891)
 Udara toxopeusi (Corbet, 1937)
Subgenus Selmanix Eliot & Kawazoé, 1983
 Udara aemulus Eliot & Kawazoé, 1983
 Udara ceyx (de Nicéville, [1893])
 Udara nishiyamai Eliot & Kawazoé, 1983
 Udara santotomasana Eliot & Kawazoé, 1983
 Udara selma (Druce, 1895)
 Udara wilemani  Eliot & Kawazoé, 1983
Subgenus Penudara Eliot & Kawazoé, 1983
 Udara albocaerulea (Moore, 1879)
 Udara oviana (Fruhstorfer, 1917)
 Udara tyotaroi Eliot & Kawazoé, 1983
Subgenus Perivaga
 Udara antonia Eliot & Kawazoé, 1983
 Udara cybele Eliot & Kawazoé, 1983
 Udara davenporti (Parsons, 1986)
 Udara laetitia Eliot & Kawazoé, 1983
 Udara manokwariensis (Joicey, Noakes & Talbot, 1915)
 Udara meeki (Bethune-Baker, 1906)
 Udara owgarra (Bethune-Baker, 1906)
 Udara pullus (Joicey & Talbot, 1916)
 Udara sibatanii Eliot & Kawazoé, 1983
Subgenus Vaga
 Udara blackburnii (Tuely, 1878) - Hawaiian blue (Hawaii)

References

"Udara Toxopeus, 1928" at Markku Savela's Lepidoptera and some other life forms

 
Lycaenidae genera
Taxa named by Lambertus Johannes Toxopeus